Saint Aunarius (Aunacharius) (c.540–c.603) was bishop of Auxerre during the 6th century.

Being of noble birth, he was brought up in the royal court of Guntram, but wanted to become a priest, and was ordained by Saint Syagrius of Autun, and eventually was made Bishop of Auxerre.

His administration is noted for certain important disciplinary measures that throw light on the religious and moral life of the Merovingian times. He caused solemn litanies to be said daily in the chief centers of population, by rotation, and on the first day of each month in the larger towns and monasteries.

He enforced a regular daily attendance at the Divine Office on the part both of regular and secular clergy. He held (578 or 585) the Council of Auxerre; an important synod of four bishops, seven abbots, thirty-five priests, and four deacons for the restoration of ecclesiastical discipline and the suppression of popular pagan superstitions, and caused the lives of his predecessors Amator and Germanus to be written.

Veneration
Aunarius was buried at Auxerre, where he has always been held in veneration. His remains were later enclosed in a golden chest, but were partially dispersed by the Huguenots in 1567. A portion, however, was placed in the hollow pillar of a crypt, and saved.

His feast day is celebrated on 25 September.

References

540 births
603 deaths
Bishops of Auxerre
6th-century Burgundian bishops
7th-century Frankish saints